Psychology, Public Policy, and Law is a quarterly peer-reviewed academic journal published by the American Psychological Association. It publishes original empirical papers, reviews, and meta-analyses on the contribution of psychological science to law and public policy.

The journal has implemented the Transparency and Openness Promotion (TOP) Guidelines.  The TOP Guidelines provide structure to research planning and reporting and aim to make research more transparent, accessible, and reproducible.

Abstracting and indexing 
The journal is abstracted and indexed by Criminal Justice Abstracts, Current Contents, Family Index, PsycINFO, PubMed, Scopus, and the Social Sciences Citation Index. According to the Journal Citation Reports, the journal has a 2020 impact factor of 3.078.

Editors 
The following persons are or have been editors-in-chief of this journal:
 Michael Lamb (2013–present), University of Cambridge
 Ronald Roesch (2008–2012), Simon Fraser University
 Steven Penrod, John Jay College of Criminal Justice
 Jane Goodman-Delahunty, Charles Sturt University
 Bruce Sales, University of Arizona

References

External links 
 

Forensic psychology journals
American Psychological Association academic journals
Quarterly journals
Publications established in 1995
English-language journals
1995 establishments in the United States
Peer reviewed law journals